OK!Relax is an imprint label of Below Par Records. It was created in 2005 and so far has released records by Die! Die! Die! and The Scare.

See also

List of record labels

References

Australian independent record labels
Record labels based in Sydney